Things We Do At Night (Live From Texas) is a live album and concert film by Blue October.  It is their second concert film, fourth live album, and eleventh album overall.  The album was recorded over Thanksgiving weekend, November 28–29, 2014 at the House of Blues in Dallas, Texas. 

The set features fan favorites and hit songs from the albums Foiled, Approaching Normal, Any Man in America, and Sway, which were released after the band's previous concert film Argue with a Tree...  The album, which was put out on Blue October's label Up/Down Records and distributed by Megaforce Records was released to online digital retail outlets as well as on CD, DVD and Blu-ray formats on November 20, 2015.  The album takes its name from the song "Things We Do At Night" from the Sway album, which the band played to close their concerts on each night of the Sway tour.

The album debuted at number 175 on the Billboard 200, number 12 on the Alternative Albums chart, number 20 on the Rock Albums Chart, and number 9 on the Independent Albums Chart.

Track listing
 To Be
 Sway
 She's My Ride Home
 Say It
 Light You Up
 Congratulations
 Into the Ocean
 Should Be Loved
 Fear
 Debris
 The Getting Over It Part
 Dirt Room
 The End
 Everything (AM Limbo) / The Feel Again (Stay)
 The Worry List
 Hate Me
 X Amount of Words
 Not Broken Anymore
 Bleed Out
 Things We Do At Night
 Home / Breathe, It's Over / Credits (DVD and Blu-ray)

Personnel 
Justin Furstenfeld – lead vocals, guitar
Jeremy Furstenfeld – drums, vocals
Matt Noveskey – bass guitar, vocals
C.B. Hudson – guitar, vocals
Ryan Delahoussaye – mandolin, violin, keyboard, vocals
Alan Adams – percussion
Paul Logus – mastering

Charts

References 

2015 live albums
Blue October albums